Manuel Dubrulle (born 11 January 1972) is a retired French badminton player.

Career 
Dubrulle was licensed at Racing Club de France and served as a member of the French team for fifteen years. He won 14 French national championships in men's and mixed doubles and around fifteen international titles. He made himself available to the national teams in 2005 at the end of his sports career as a national coach, a position he held for seven years. Within the world elite, Manuel Dubrulle was also known under the pseudonym "The wiper", a nickname given to him for his exceptional mobility in the background. He is currently coaching at the Trébes badminton club. His main partners for nearly ten years in senior competitions were Vincent Laigle (1994-1999), and Mihaïl Popov (2001-2003).

Achievements

IBF International 
Men's doubles

Mixed doubles

References 

1972 births
Living people
French male badminton players
21st-century French people